Căianu Mic is a commune in Bistrița-Năsăud County, Transylvania, Romania. It is composed of four villages: Căianu Mare (Nagykaján), Căianu Mic, Ciceu-Poieni (Csicsópolyán), and Dobric (Nagydebrek). It also included two other villages until 2004, when they were transferred to Spermezeu Commune.

The commune lies on the Transylvanian Plateau, on the banks of the river Ilișua and its affluent, Dumbrăvița. It is located in the western part of the county, close to the border with Cluj and Maramureș counties.

Sights

Natives
 Johannes Caioni (1629–1687), Franciscan friar, composer
 Ana Mirela Țermure (born 1975), javelin thrower

References

Communes in Bistrița-Năsăud County
Localities in Transylvania